Becky Burke (born December 20, 1989) is an American women's basketball coach and former player. She is currently the head coach at the University at Buffalo.

Career
She attended Abington Heights High School in Clarks Summit, Pennsylvania. She later attended the University of Louisville, where she played guard for the Louisville Cardinals women's basketball team. During her freshman season in 2008–09, Burke led the Cardinals to the Final Four of the 2009 NCAA Division I women's basketball tournament, where they fell to UConn in the championship game, 76–54.

Coaching career
After graduating from Louisville, Burke later went on to serve as an assistant women's basketball coach at Saint Joseph's College before serving as head women's basketball coach at Embry–Riddle Aeronautical University, Prescott from 2016 to 2018, the University of Charleston from 2018 to 2020, and the University of South Carolina Upstate from 2020 to 2022. On April 6, 2022, Burke was named head women's basketball coach at the University at Buffalo.

Head coaching record

References

External links
 
 Buffalo Bulls bio
 USC Upstate Spartans bio
 Charleston Golden Eagles bio
 Louisville Cardinals bio

1989 births
American women's basketball coaches
Basketball coaches from Pennsylvania
Buffalo Bulls women's basketball coaches
Cal State Fullerton Titans women's basketball coaches
Female sports coaches
Living people
Louisville Cardinals women's basketball players
People from Clarks Summit, Pennsylvania
USC Upstate Spartans women's basketball coaches
Charleston Golden Eagles coaches